Aurora station may refer to:

Aurora station (Ohio), a former train station in Aurora, Ohio, U.S.A.
Aurora GO Station, an intermodal transit station in Aurora, Ontario, Canada
Aurora Metro Center station, a light rail station in Aurora, Colorado, U.S.A.
Aurora Transportation Center, an intermodal transit station in Aurora, Illinois, U.S.A.
La Aurora station, a Medellín Metro station in Colombia
Aurora Space Station, a design concept for a commercial space station

See also
Aurora (disambiguation)